Shivering is a bodily function.

Shiver may also refer to:

People
Dr. Shiver (born 1983), Italian record producer, musician, and DJ
Clay Shiver (born 1972), American football player
Harry Shiver (born 1946), American politician
Ivey Shiver (1907–1972), American football and baseball player
Kelly Shiver, member of the country music duo Thrasher Shiver
Sanders Shiver (born 1955), American football player and coach

Music

Albums
Shiver (D. C. Simpson album), 2005
Shiver (Jamie O'Neal album) or the title song (see below), 2000
Shiver (Jenny Morris album) or the title song, 1989
Shiver (Jónsi album) or the title song, 2020
Shiver (Rose Chronicles album) or the title song, 1994

Songs
"Shiver" (Coldplay song), 2000
"Shiver" (The Gazette song), 2010
"Shiver" (George Benson song), 1986
"Shiver" (Jamie O'Neal song), 2000
"Shiver" (Natalie Imbruglia song), 2005
"Shiver" (Shawn Desman song), 2010
"Shiver", by the Birthday Massacre from Looking Glass, 2008
"Shiver", by Elliot Minor from Solaris, 2010
"Shiver", by Maroon 5 from Songs About Jane, 2002
"Shiver", by Whole Doubts featuring Jaira Burns, 2019
Shiver (song by False Noise), 2018

Other uses
Shiver (2003 film), a Hong Kong horror film
Shiver (2012 film), an American thriller film
Shiver, a 2009 Wolves of Mercy Falls novel by Maggie Stiefvater
Shiver (novel), a 2021 novel by Allie Reynolds
Shiver Point, a summit in Graham Land, Antarctica
Shiver Productions, a British TV production company
Aprilia SL 750 Shiver, a motorcycle
Shiver, a member of Deep Cut in Splatoon 3

See also
Eskalofrío (from escalofrío, Spanish for "shiver"), a 2008 Spanish horror film
Shiver Me Timbers (disambiguation)
Shivers (disambiguation)
Shudder (disambiguation)